Oestrophasia calva is a species of bristle fly in the family Tachinidae.

Distribution
Canada, United States, Mexico.

References

Dexiinae
Taxa named by Daniel William Coquillett
Insects described in 1902
Diptera of North America